Beauce is a federal electoral district in Quebec, Canada, that has been represented in the House of Commons of Canada since 1867. In 2006, it had a population of 103,617 people, of whom 82,123 were eligible voters.

The Beauce riding has the highest percentage of people who answered "Canadian" as their ethnic origin in the 2006 Census (84.0%; multiple responses).

It is also the riding with the highest percentage of Whites of European descent (99.3%).

Geography

The riding is located in Central Quebec, to the south of Quebec City and covers the centre of Beauce, straddling the Quebec region of Chaudière-Appalaches.

The electoral district has the regional county municipalities of Beauce-Sartigan and Robert-Cliche; that part of the Regional County Municipality of Les Etchemins comprises the municipalities of Sainte-Aurélie, Saint-Benjamin, Saint-Prosper and Saint-Zacharie; the Regional County Municipality of La Nouvelle-Beauce, excepting the Parish Municipality of Saint-Lambert-de-Lauzon; and that part of the Regional County Municipality of Le Granit comprises the municipalities of Saint-Ludger and Saint-Robert-Bellarmin.

The neighbouring ridings are Mégantic—L'Érable, Lotbinière—Chutes-de-la-Chaudière, and Lévis—Bellechasse.

History
The riding was created by the British North America Act of 1867, and still exists today without any name changes, although its boundaries have been redefined numerous times.

According to the 2012 federal electoral redistribution, this riding will lose a small territory to Mégantic—L'Érable. It is one of a small minority of Quebecois ridings never to have elected a Bloc Quebecois MP, even in 1993.

Members of Parliament

This riding has elected the following Members of Parliament:

Electoral history

This riding lost a small portion of its territory to Mégantic—L'Érable prior to the 42nd Canadian federal election:

Beauce, 2003 representation order

Beauce, previous elections

	

	

	

	

Note: Social Credit vote is compared to Ralliement créditiste vote in the 1968 election.

Note: Ralliement créditiste vote is compared to Social Credit vote in the 1963 election.

	

	

	

	

Note: results compared to results of 1900 general election.

See also
 List of Canadian federal electoral districts
 Past Canadian electoral districts

References

Campaign expense data from Elections Canada
2011 Results from Elections Canada
Parliamentary website, History of Federal Ridings since 1867

Notes

Quebec federal electoral districts
Saint-Georges, Quebec
Sainte-Marie, Quebec